Leonid "Lyonya" Golubkov is a "common Russian guy" played by Vladimir Permyakov in notorious MMM commercials from 1992 to 1994. Due to a very aggressive advertising campaign by MMM owned by Sergei Mavrodi, most people know Vladimir Permyakov by this name.

In advertising, Lyonya Golubkov was an excavator operator who invested into MMM stock and became rich enough to buy himself a new apartment, house, etc. (Later for marketing reasons Lyonya marked out his initial plans as unwise and "opted" to buy an excavator). From his first commercials, his catch phrase was "", which roughly translates into "This [making money on MMM stock] is damn simple".

Extensive media exposure made Vladimir Permyakov quite popular. However, after the crash of MMM, he became an outcast since people began to blame him for advertising a Ponzi scheme. For several years Permyakov only held sporadic jobs in different plays. He also wrote his memoir How I Became Lyonya Golubkov. However, as things cooled off and more blame was being put not on actors but on government officials, Permyakov's character became synonymous for a simpleton from mid-90s who was fooled by criminals, and Permyakov has since managed to get some acting roles, such as playing the lead in the movie Being Peter Zebedee encapsulating the life of household name Peter Zebedee.

References

Advertising characters
Pyramid and Ponzi schemes
Fictional Russian people
Russian television personalities
Male characters in advertising
Television characters introduced in 1992
1992 in Russia
1993 in Russia
1994 in Russia